The Sulu Sea (Tausug: Dagat sin Sūg; Chavacano: Mar de Sulu; Cebuano: Dagat sa Sulu; Hiligaynon: Dagat sang Sulu; Karay-a: Dagat kang Sulu; Cuyonon: Dagat i'ang Sulu) is a body of water in the southwestern area of the Philippines, separated from the South China Sea in the northwest by Palawan and from the Celebes Sea in the southeast by the Sulu Archipelago. Borneo is found to the southwest and Visayas to the northeast.

The Sulu Sea contains a number of islands. The Cuyo Islands and the Cagayan Islands are part of the province of Palawan whereas Mapun and the Turtle Islands are part of the province of Tawi-Tawi. Sulu Sea is also where the Tubbataha Reef National Marine Park, one of the World Heritage Sites is located.

The Panay Gulf is an extension of the Sulu Sea.  Straits out of the Sulu Sea include the Iloilo Strait, the Guimaras Strait, and the Basilan Strait.

Geography
The Pacific Ocean flows into Sulu Sea in northern Mindanao and between Sangihe talaud Archipelago, North Sulawesi.

Extent
The International Hydrographic Organization (IHO) defines the Sulu Sea as being one of the waters of the East Indian Archipelago. The IHO defines its limits as follows:

In popular culture
The Star Trek character Hikaru Sulu is named after the Sulu Sea. According to Sulu actor George Takei, "[Gene] Roddenberry's vision for Sulu was to represent all of Asia, being named for the Sulu Sea instead of using a country-specific name".

See also
Sulu Pirates

References

External links

 
Marginal seas of the Pacific Ocean
Seas of the Philippines
Seas of Malaysia
Geography of Mindanao
Malaysia–Philippines border
Maritime Southeast Asia